Tanya Chan (born 14 September 1971) is a Hong Kong politician who served as a Legislative Councillor representing Hong Kong Island from 2008 to 2012, and again from 2016 to 2020. She is a founding member of the Civic Party. Chan is sometimes known as the "Zhou Xun of the Civic Party". On 29 Sep 2020, Chan announced that she will quit politics.

Early life and education
Chan's ancestral origin is Shanghai and she was educated at Sacred Heart Canossian College. Chan received Bachelor of Laws degree from the University of Hong Kong, where she also studied the Postgraduate Certificate in Laws.

Political career
In the 2008 LegCo elections, Chan was elected into and became a member of, the Hong Kong Legislative Council to represent Hong Kong Island, along with Civic Party leader Audrey Eu.

In January 2010, Chan and other four lawmakers, Albert Chan, Alan Leong, Leung Kwok-hung and Wong Yuk-man resigned from LegCo, forcing a by-election, which they would treat as a "de facto referendum" to press the Chinese Government into allowing universal suffrage in Hong Kong. On 16 May 2010, she was re-elected as a lawmaker in the by-election.

Until 2011, she was a member of Central and Western District Council.

In the 2012 legislative election, she stood as the second candidate in Kenneth Chan's list in Hong Kong Island, in an attempt to boost Civic Party's votes and seats. Although Kenneth Chan was elected, she lost re-election under the party-list proportional representation system. In the 2016 legislative election, she was returned to the Legislative Council, succeeding outgoing Kenneth Chan's seat.

Trial at West Kowloon Court
On 9 April 2019, at West Kowloon Court, Chan and eight others were found guilty of public nuisance and incitement over their roles in the 2014 Hong Kong protests.

Earlier, Chan scheduled a full-body health check-up to reassure her mother that she was physically ready to endure a jail term if this were to happen. Her physical examination was conducted in a private hospital on 4 April. Chan received the results of her health check on 11 April, followed by a consultation in Canossa Hospital on 17 April. The test results revealed there was something unclear with her brain. On 18 April, Dr Edmund Woo Kin-wai, a neurologist, found that Tanya Chan had a meningioma, a type of brain tumour larger than a ping-pong ball. The tumour was considered dangerous as it pressed on Chan's brain stem, nerves, and blood vessels.

On 23 April, medics stated that Chan needed open brain surgery to remove the tumour as soon as possible, followed by radiotherapy sessions. According to medics, there was no clarity whether the tumour was caused by cancer, and an open brain surgery would be necessary for additional medical insights. On 24 April, the trial at West Kowloon Court adjourned her sentencing to 10 June, since Chan required brain surgery within two weeks. The other eight Occupy Central leaders were sentenced to different punishments, ranging from 200 hours community service to 16 months of jail time.

In the same day, Chan asked Legislative Council president Andrew Leung for leave from her legislative duties while she sought further treatment. Before speaking about her illness, she also asked Hongkongers to continue their fight for democracy and to believe in their faith.
 
On 10 June 2019, Chan was handed a sentence of eight months suspended for two years, after the court was told that she would require radiotherapy treatment and will experience double vision for six months. Her brain tumour was found to be benign, but had not been completely removed, and needed further therapy. The court was also asked to consider her record of public service since 2006.

Bibliography 
 政．戲．伊人 [Politics. play. Yiren], Ming Chuang Publishing Co., Ltd., 2008, ISBN 9789628994663
 My Journeys for Food and Justice (邊走邊吃邊抗爭), Red Publishing (Round Table Culture), 2014, ISBN 9789888270644

References

External links

Tanya Chan's official website

1971 births
Alumni of the University of Hong Kong
Barristers of Hong Kong
District councillors of Central and Western District
Charter 08 signatories
Living people
Civic Party politicians
HK LegCo Members 2008–2012
HK LegCo Members 2016–2021
Members of the Election Committee of Hong Kong, 2007–2012
Hong Kong women lawyers
Hong Kong political prisoners
21st-century Hong Kong women politicians